Adrienne Thomas may refer to:

 Adrienne Thomas (archivist), American archivist
 Adrienne Thomas (novelist) (1897–1980), pseudonym of Hertha A. Deutsch, a German novelist